The Eastern Football Conference (EFC) was an NCAA Division II intercollegiate athletic football conference that existed from 1997 to 2000 and was composed of member schools from the Northeastern United States. During its entire existence, its membership was geographically divided into two separate divisions: the Atlantic Division and the Bay State/Central Division (its name was changed after the 1998 season). A conference championship game between the winners of the two divisions was held annually. Former members are currently scattered between the Colonial Athletic Association (Division I FCS) and the Northeast-10 Conference (Division II), the latter of which was founded in 2001.

Members

Champions

 Conference championship game winner listed in bold.

Yearly standings

See also
 List of defunct college football conferences

References

 
College sports in Massachusetts
College sports in New York (state)